Carex gibbsiae is a species of true sedge in the family Cyperaceae, native to Fiji. It is a tufted perennial which is found in upland forests of the main island, Viti Levu.

References

gibbsiae
Endemic flora of Fiji
Plants described in 1909
Taxa named by Alfred Barton Rendle